Rafiga Haji gizi Akhundova (born 7 August 1931) is an Azerbaijani ballet dancer, ballet master. People's Artist of the Azerbaijan SSR (1970).

Biography 
Rafiga Akhundova graduated from Baku Choreography School in 1951. Completed an advanced course at the Bolshoi Theater (1951–1952, Moscow). From 1951 to 1971, she was a soloist of the Azerbaijan Opera and Ballet Theater. Since 1971, she has been the ballet master of that theater, and since 1990, she has been the chief ballet master. Together with her husband Magsud Mammadov, she staged the ballets "Caspian ballad" (1968, T. Bakikhanov), "Shadows of Gobustan" (1969, F. Garayev), "Yalli" and "Azerbaijan Suite" (1969, R. Hajiyev), "The Path of Thunder" and "Seven Beauties" (1975, 1978, G. Garayev), "Babek" (1986, A. Alizadeh), "The Nutcracker" (1988, P. Tchaikovsky) at the Azerbaijan Opera and Ballet Theater, as well as "The Path of Thunder" (1976, G. Garayev) at the Novosibirsk Opera and Ballet Theater. She worked as a teacher-ballet master in Algeria, Sweden, Egypt and Belgium. "Caspian Ballad", "Shadows of Gobustan" and "Azerbaijani Suite" were presented at the 7th International Dance Festival held in Paris in 1969 and were awarded the diploma of the Paris Dance Academy. In 1994, she staged the ballet "Seven Beauties" in Ankara (together with Magsud Mammadov).

Rafiga Akhundova is the wife of ballet master Magsud Mammadov.

On 26 April 1958 she received the honorary title of "Honored Artist of the Azerbaijan SSR" and, on 21 May 1970, the honorary title of "People's Artist of the Azerbaijan SSR". On 9 June 1959 she was awarded the Order of the Badge of Honour, and on 6 August 2021 the Shohrat Order.

References

Source 
 Cabir, S. "Gənc istedadlar" [Müəllim-aktrisa, "Qızmar günəş altında" kino-filmində Gülpəri rolunu oynayan Sürəyya Qasımova və Opera və Balet Teatrının gənc balet artisti Rəfiqə Axundova haqqında] //Ədəbiyyat və incəsənət.- 1957.- 28 dekabr.
 Şəhriyar Cəfərov: "Bu ölkədə vətənpərvərlik yad janra çevrilib"

1931 births
Living people
Honored Artists of the Azerbaijan SSR
Recipients of the Shohrat Order
Azerbaijani ballerinas
Azerbaijani ballet masters